"Stupify" is a song by American heavy metal band Disturbed. It was released on 12 April 2000, as the first single from their debut album, The Sickness. It peaked at No. 12 on the United States Mainstream Rock Tracks chart and No. 10 on the Modern Rock Tracks chart. The song was used in an English adaptation of the Dragon Ball Z movie, Lord Slug, in the trailer for the film Swimfan, and remixed for the movie Little Nicky as "Stupify (Fu's Forbidden Little Nicky Remix)", and even Little Scarlet. Unlike many other Disturbed songs, "Stupify" features mostly synthesizers throughout the song.

Meaning
The song is against racism and discrimination. The song is about a relationship Disturbed's vocalist David Draiman had with a Latina girl. He said her family didn't approve of him because of his different ethnicity.

Music video
The video for the song features the band performing the song in a rusted cellar-like room, intercut with footage of a young boy sitting in the same room. As the song progresses, the boy is revealed to be haunted by ghost-like images. David Draiman said that the boy represents his inner child and also said, "This inner child has been damaged in such a way that the world he sees around him is dark and frightening and marred by life experience. It's haunted by specters and ghosts from the past."

Track listing

Version one
 "Stupify" – 4:34
 "Stupify"  – 4:34
 "The Game"  – 3:47
 "Stupify"  – 5:08

Version two
 "Stupify" – 4:34
 "The Game"  – 3:47
 "Voices"  – 3:11
 "Down with the Sickness" – 4:38

European version
 "Stupify"  – 4:05
 "Stupify"  – 4:05

US promo
 "Stupify (The Forbidden "Fu" Mix)" – 5:08

Chart positions

Personnel
 David Draiman – lead vocals, backing vocals
 Dan Donegan – guitars, synthesizers, backing vocals
 Steve Kmak – bass guitar
 Mike Wengren – drums, percussion, programming

References

2000 debut singles
2000 songs
Songs against racism and xenophobia
Disturbed (band) songs
Giant Records (Warner) singles
Songs written by Dan Donegan
Songs written by David Draiman
Songs written by Mike Wengren
Song recordings produced by Johnny K